Qorbanabad may refer to:
 Qorbanabad, Fars
 Qorbanabad, Golestan
 Qorbanabad, Minudasht, Golestan Province
 Qorbanabad, Kerman
 Qorbanabad, Dargaz, Razavi Khorasan Province